Karl Harrington Potter (August 19, 1927 – January 11, 2022) was an American-born writer, academic, and Indologist, from the University of Washington. He studied at the University of California, as well as Harvard University and is known for his writings on Indian philosophy.

Potter has served as a Professor, of the department of Philosophy and South Asian Studies at the University of Washington. He has been called an eminent scholar by his peers.

He is credited with a number of books on the topic. The Government of India honored Potter in 2011 with the fourth highest civilian award of Padma Shri. Potter died in January 2022, at the age of 94.

Selected works
 Monographs
 
 

 Bibliography 
 BIBLIOGRAPHY OF INDIAN PHILOSOPHIES (online), last edition 15/4/2020 Internet Archive copy

 General editor

See also
 Indian philosophy
 Indology

References

External links
 Bibliography on Indian Philosophies
 

1927 births
2022 deaths
20th-century American male writers
20th-century American non-fiction writers
21st-century American male writers
21st-century American non-fiction writers
Recipients of the Padma Shri in literature & education
American Indologists
American male non-fiction writers
University of Washington faculty
University of California, Berkeley alumni
Harvard University alumni
Writers from Oakland, California